Watson Jones was an American sound engineer. He was nominated for an Academy Award in the category Best Sound Recording for the film Not as a Stranger.

Selected filmography
 Not as a Stranger (1955)

References

External links

Year of birth missing
Year of death missing
American audio engineers